Hertha Doreck, née Sieverts (1889 – 30 March 1991), was a German paleontologist.

Life
Hertha Walburger Doris Doreck was born in Völklingen, German Empire, in 1899. She trained as a teacher for schools in Prussia, but became interested in mathematics and the natural sciences. Doreck focused on zoology, paleontology and geology during her time at the University of Berlin and she researched Cretaceous Crinoids for her dissertation under the supervision of Josef Felix Pompeckj that she completed in 1927. Only able to find a series of short-term positions, she was finally hired at the Institute for Applied Geology in Bonn at a very low salary in 1930. Although she mostly worked as a personal assistant, she was able to work with the fossil collection. After five years she got a training opportunity at the
National Prussian Geological Institute in Berlin and was hired there in 1936 she as a scientific assistant. This job entailed mapping and field work and was unusual to be performed by a woman at that time. Her public employment ended in 1936 when she married Walter Doreck and
entered the housewife and "private-research" phase of her life. Despite having two daughters, Horeck continued to be active in research and reported her work on Crinoids in the journal Zentralblatt for fourteen years. "In the early 1950s, Doreck was invited to Lawrence, Kansas, by R. C.Moore, and publicized as the 'German Crinoid Expert.' She had devised a system of classification for Mesozoic Crinoids that, although never published, was and still is the basis for the systematics of this group. During the last years of her research, Doreck turned to the systematics of the Holothuroideans. During the years she spent as a housewife, she had little time to pursue her research goals. Her husband became seriously ill, and she took care of him until his death in 1972. She died on 30 March 1991."

Notes

References

1889 births
1991 deaths
German paleontologists